The Ministry of Agriculture is a Portuguese government ministry.

History
The Ministry of Agriculture was first created in 1918. Since then, it has been restructured, extinguished and reestablished several times, under various designations:

1918 – Ministry of Agriculture (Ministério da Agricultura)
1932 – Ministry of Commerce, Industry and Agriculture (Ministério do Comércio, Indústria e Agricultura)
1933 – Ministry of Agriculture (Ministério da Agricultura)
1940 – Undersecretariat of State for Agriculture (Subsecretariado de Estado da Agricultura), a division of the Ministry of Economy
1958 – Secretariat of State for Agriculture (Secretaria de Estado da Agricultura), a division of the Ministry of Economy
1974 – Ministry of Agriculture and Commerce (Ministério da Agricultura e Comércio)
1974 – Secretariat of State for Agriculture (Secretaria de Estado da Agricultura), a division of the Ministry of Economic Coordination
1974 – Secretariat of State for Agriculture (Secretaria de Estado da Agricultura), a division of the Ministry of Economy
1975 – Ministry of Agriculture and Fisheries (Ministério da Agricultura e Pescas)
1981 – Ministry of Agriculture, Commerce and Fisheries (Ministério da Agricultura, Comércio e Pescas)
1993 – Ministry of Agriculture, Forestry and Food (Ministério da Agricultura, Florestas e Alimentação); the fisheries sector transfers to the Ministry of the Sea
1986 – Ministry of Agriculture, Fisheries and Food (Ministério da Agricultura, Pescas e Alimentação)
1991 – Ministry of Agriculture (Ministério da Agricultura); the fisheries sector transfers to the Ministry of Maritime Affairs
1995 – Ministry of Agriculture, Rural Development and Fisheries (Ministério da Agricultura, do Desenvolvimento Rural e das Pescas)
2004 – Ministry of Agriculture, Fisheries and Forestry (Ministério da Agricultura, Pescas e Florestas)
2005 – Ministry of Agriculture, Rural Development and Fisheries (Ministério da Agricultura, do Desenvolvimento Rural e das Pescas)
2011 – Ministry of Agriculture, the Sea, the Environment, and Spatial Planning (Ministério da Agricultura, do Mar, do Ambiente e do Ordenamento do Território)
2013 – Ministry of Agriculture and the Sea (Ministério da Agricultura e do Mar)
 2015 – Ministry of Agriculture, Forestry and Rural Development (Ministério da Agricultura, Florestas e Desenvolvimento Rural; the fisheries sector transfers to the Ministry of Maritime Affairs
 2019 – Ministry of Agriculture (Ministério da Agricultura)
 2022 – Ministry of Agriculture and Food (Ministério da Agricultura e Alimentação)

External links
  

Agriculture, Forestry and Rural Development
Portugal
Portugal
Portugal
Agricultural organisations based in Portugal
Forestry in Portugal